Vincenzo Salemme (born 24 July 1957) is an Italian actor, playwright, director and screenwriter.

Life and career 
Born in Bacoli, Province of Naples, Salemme began his career in 1976, with the stage company of Tato Russo. 

The following year he joined the theatre crew of Eduardo De Filippo, later led by his son Luca, where he worked until 1992. In a 2018 interview, he said that De Filippo taught him to "italianise" words in Neapolitan when not in Naples, so everybody could understand the play.

In the 1990s, Salemme started writing and producing his own comedy plays, enjoying a large success with E fuori nevica. 

He debuted in the movie industry the early 1980s as a character actor; following his increasing popularity on stage, in 1998 he wrote, directed and starred in the comedy film L'amico del cuore, which enjoyed a considerable commercial success. 

In the following years, Salemme alternated his personal projects, on stage and on the big screen, and leading roles in films by other directors, usually comedies.

Salemme was also the protagonist of two television shows, Famiglia Salemme Show (2006) and Da Nord a Sud... e ho detto tutto! (2009), both of them aired on RAI.

Filmography

As director and screenwriter 
My Best Friend's Wife (1998)
Amore a prima vista (1999)
Freewheeling (2000)
God Willing (2002)
Ho visto le stelle! (2003)
Cose da pazzi (2005)
SMS - Sotto mentite spoglie (2007)
No Problem (2008)
...E fuori nevica! (2014)
Se mi lasci non vale (2016)
Una festa esagerata (2018)

As actor (selection) 

Sweet Dreams (1981)
Sweet Body of Bianca (1984)
The Mass Is Ended (1985)
Picasso's Face (1998)
My Best Friend's Wife (1998)
Amore a prima vista (1999)
Freewheeling (2000)
My Best Friend's Wife (2000)
God Willing (2002)
Ho visto le stelle! (2003)
Opopomoz (2003)
Cose da pazzi (2005)
Olé (2006)
SMS - Sotto mentite spoglie (2007)
No Problem (2008)
Ex (2009)
Baarìa (2009)
La vita è una cosa meravigliosa (2010)
Ex 2: Still Friends? (2011)
Baciato dalla fortuna (2011)
Make a Fake (2011)
10 Rules for Falling in Love (2012)
Buona giornata (2012)
Us in the U.S. (2013)
Sapore di te (2014)
...E fuori nevica! (2014)
Ma tu di che segno sei? (2014)
Se mi lasci non vale (2016)
Prima di lunedì (2016)
Non si ruba a casa dei ladri (2016)
Caccia al tesoro (2017)
Il contagio (2017)
Una festa esagerata (2018)
Il sesso degli angeli (2022)

References

External links 

 

1957 births
Living people
Italian male stage actors
Italian male film actors
Italian male television actors
Italian male screenwriters
20th-century Italian screenwriters
21st-century Italian screenwriters
Italian television personalities
20th-century Italian male actors
21st-century Italian male actors
People from the Province of Naples
20th-century Italian dramatists and playwrights
21st-century Italian dramatists and playwrights
Italian film directors
Italian male dramatists and playwrights